Ruchyovo is a rural locality (a selo) in Kazantsevsky Selsoviet, Kuryinsky District, Altai Krai, Russia. The population was 182 as of 2013. There are 4 streets.

Geography 
Ruchyovo is located 29 km south of Kurya (the district's administrative centre) by road. Kazantsevo is the nearest rural locality.

References 

Rural localities in Kuryinsky District